The 2010 Derby City Council election took place on 5 May 2010 to elect members of Derby City Council in England. One third of the council was up for election and the council remained under No Overall Control.

Election result

All comparisons in vote share are to the corresponding 2006 election.

Ward results

Abbey

Allestree

Alvaston

Arboretum

Blagreaves

Boulton

Chaddesden

Chellaston

Darley

Derwent

Littleover

Mackworth

Mickleover

Normanton

Oakwood

Sinfin

Spondon

Notes and references
Notes 
 
References

Derby
May 2010 events in the United Kingdom
Derby City Council elections
2010s in Derby